Fernando Romboli was the defending champion but chose not to participate.

Darian King won the title after defeating Víctor Estrella Burgos 5–7, 6–4, 7–5 in the final.

Seeds

Draw

Finals

Top half

Bottom half

References
Main Draw
Qualifying Draw

Seguros Bolívar Open Cali - Singles